Stroock & Stroock & Lavan LLP (known as Stroock) is an American law firm based in New York City, with offices also in Los Angeles, Miami, and Washington, DC.

Stroock provides transactional and litigation guidance to multinational corporations, financial institutions, investment banks, and private equity firms in the U.S. and abroad. Stroock's practice areas include capital markets/securities, commercial finance, mergers and acquisitions and joint ventures, private equity, private funds, derivatives and commodities, employment law and benefits, energy and project finance, entertainment, environmental law, financial restructuring, financial services litigation, government relations, insurance, intellectual property, investment management, litigation, national security, personal client services, real estate, structured finance, and tax.

The firm and many of its attorneys are annually ranked and listed in a number of industry publications, including Chambers USA, Chambers Global, The Legal 500, Best Lawyers, and Super Lawyers.

History

The firm was founded in New York City in 1876 by M. Warley Platzek at 176 Broadway as a solo practice. In 1886, associate Moses J. Stroock joined the firm, followed ten years later by his younger brother, Sol M. Stroock. In 1907, when Platzek left for the New York Supreme Court, the firm was renamed Stroock & Stroock. Two years later, the firm moved to 30 Broad Street, adjacent to the New York Stock Exchange, and began cultivating its long-standing relationships with Wall Street’s major financial companies.

In 1919, Peter I. B. Lavan joined the firm. Over the next two decades, Stroock continued its shift toward a corporate and financial practice, developing a national reputation in commercial law. Its offices moved to 61 Broadway in 1937 and the firm was renamed Stroock & Stroock & Lavan in 1943.

Stroock opened its Los Angeles office in 1975. In 1983, the New York office moved to 7 Hanover Lane, and, finally, into its current office space at 180 Maiden Lane. In 2013, Stroock opened its Washington, DC office on K Street.

The firm has assisted Mark Burnett and Roma Downey with legal advisement when forming the United Artist Media Group in September 2014.

Practice areas
Stroock's main practice groups include:

Corporate (i.e., Capital Markets/Securities; Commercial Finance; Mergers, Acquisitions, and Joint Ventures; and Private Equity/Venture Capital)
Commodities and Derivatives
Employee Benefits and Executive Compensation
Employment Law
Energy and Project Finance
Entertainment
Environmental Law
Financial Restructuring
Financial Services Litigation
Government Relations
Insurance
Intellectual Property
Investment Management (including Private Funds)
Litigation
National Security/CFIUS Compliance
Personal Client Services
Pro Bono
Real Estate
Structured Finance
Tax

Notable past and current attorneys
Robert Abrams, former New York State Attorney General
Brian Cogan, federal judge
Briahna Joy Gray, political consultant 
Rita Hauser, US Ambassador to the UN Human Rights Council
Alvin Hellerstein, federal judge
Edward Korman, federal judge
Benedict I. Lubell, oil industry executive
Margaret Nagle, federal judge
Jules Polonetsky, head of the Future of Privacy Forum
Maxwell M. Rabb, former ambassador
Shira Scheindlin, federal judge
Lou Silver, American-Israeli basketball player
William vanden Heuvel, former ambassador
Randi Weingarten, head of the American Federation of Teachers
Steven Schultz, District Judge, Colorado Seventh Judicial District

References

External links
 Stroock & Stroock & Lavan LLP Web Site
 Chambers USA Profile
 National Law Review Profile

Law firms based in New York City
Law firms established in 1876
1876 establishments in New York (state)